Concentrotheca is a genus of cnidarians belonging to the family Caryophylliidae.

The species of this genus are found in Central America.

Species:

Concentrotheca laevigata 
Concentrotheca vaughani

References

Caryophylliidae
Scleractinia genera